Corvara is a comune and town in the Province of Pescara in the Abruzzo region of Italy. It is located in Gran Sasso e Monti della Laga National Park. In late 2021, it was subject to a devastating flooding that destroyed 7 buildings killing 2 people and leaving dozens more homeless.

References

Cities and towns in Abruzzo